Uloborus canus is a species of spider in the family Uloboridae, found in Australia. The species was first described by W.S. Macleay in 1827. His very brief description said it had a convex white thorax, the first and second legs were equal in length, and the femora were black-spotted. The type specimen has been lost.

References

Uloboridae
Spiders of Australia
Spiders described in 1827